This is a list of years in Peru. See also the timeline of Peruvian history. For only articles about years in Peru that have been written, see .

19th century

20th century

21st century

See also
 Timeline of Peruvian history
 Timeline of Lima
List of years by country

 
History of Peru
Peru history-related lists